Bernhard Hirzel (12 August 1807 – 6 June 1847 in Paris) was a Swiss theologian and Orientalist.

He studied theology  in Zürich (1819–31) and philology in Berlin and Paris, promoted 1833 in Göttingen. He married  Maria Elisa Tobler in 1833.
From 1833 he was reading in Zürich, and was elected professor for oriental languages in 1835. His lectures met with little interest, with only two out of 43 announced.
In 1837, he left Zürich for a position as pastor in Pfäffikon.

The election of  David Strauss, a free-thinking theologian and pioneer in the historical investigation of Jesus, to the University of Zürich caused a tumult among the rural population, resulting in Hirzel leading a troop of insurgents to Zürich, which succeeded to force the city council to surrender.
In 1845, Hirzel quit his post in Pfäffikon and again became reader at Zürich University, but was soon forced to flee because of his involvement in a case of financial fraud. He went into exile in Paris, where he committed suicide by taking poison in 1847.

Translations from the Sanskrit 
   Sakuntala (Zürich 1833)
 Urwasi (Frauenfeld 1838)
 Meghaduta oder der Wolkenbote (Frauenfeld 1846)

References
P. Aerne, Nicht nur "Blutpfaff": Aspekte aus Bernhard H.s (1807–1847) Wirksamkeit, in ZTb 1992, 1993, 229–263
P. Aerne, 'Pfarrer, Sanskritist und "Glaubensgeneral". Bernhard H. hält Lebensrückschau', in Vom Luxus des Geistes,  F. Richner et al. (eds.), 1994, 241–272

1807 births
1847 deaths
People from Zürich
People associated with the University of Zurich
Suicides by poison
Suicides in France
Swiss orientalists
People from Pfäffikon, Zürich